
The following lists events that happened during 1855 in South Africa.

Events
 Pretoria is established
 20 Irish miners arrive to work in the Namaqualand copper mines
 27 August - Jacobus Boshoff becomes the 2nd president of the Orange Free State

Births
 24 March - Olive Schreiner, author and feminist

References
See Years in South Africa for list of References

Years in South Africa